Kurinjipadi (also spelt as Kurinjippadi) is a taluk in Cuddalore district in the India, state of Tamil Nadu.

Geography

Demography and politics
 India census, Kurinjipadi had a population of 23,159. Males constitute 51% of the population and females 49%. Kurinjipadi has an average literacy rate of 66%, higher than the national average of 59.5%: male literacy is 74%, and female literacy is 58%. In Kurinjipadi, 12% of the population is under 6 years of age. Kurinjipadi assembly constituency is part of Cuddalore (Lok Sabha constituency).

Economy
Kurinjipadi one of the 13 hand loom clusters in India famous for hand loom products since the 18th century. The hand loom lungies are exported to Singapore, Malaysia, Sri Lanka, Gulf countries and other East Asian nations. It is strategically located close to Chidambaram, Cuddalore, Panruti, Neyveli and Virudhachalam. The dairy products and crops from this region are of good quality. The major crops are Paddy, Sugarcane and Groundnut. Saravana Global Energy Ltd is major employment source. Agriculture and Handloom are major source of income. It is still not satisfied in industrial opportunities. A special economic Zone is necessary for development in economical means.
it is also a newly divided taluk.

Landmarks
The Shri Subraya Swamigal shrine has its own significance for the antique idols made from the 18th century to the 20th century.

The ruins of Venugopalaswami temple at Vengadampet or Vengadampatti, which is almost 500 years old, is an exemplary red brick architecture built by Rani Vengattammal. Pondicherry Chief Dubash Anandharangapillai's diary contains a reference about this temple and its connection with the Anglo-French war.

Education
Schools in Kurinjipadi are Government Higher secondary school,  S.K.Velayutham Higher Secondary School (Govt Aided), Sri Gayathri Matriculation School, St. Paul Matriculation Higher Secondary school, S.K.V.T Matriculation school, Arunachala matriculation school, Sri Ram matriculation higher secondary  school etc.  Colleges are S.K.V Women's Arts and Science College and Thiruvalluvar Arts and Science College. In 1999 a teacher training college (Om Muruga teacher training institute) has been set up. Several Computer education and Information Technology training institutes have come up in the region.

References

See also

Cities and towns in Cuddalore district